Willie Irvine (born 26 May 1956) is a Scottish former professional footballer. Irvine, a direct, left-sided forward, started his senior career with Celtic, but failed to break into the first team. After playing in junior football for a spell, he signed for Alloa Athletic. His play for Alloa quickly attracted the attention of Motherwell, who paid £25,000 to Alloa for his services in 1979.

Irvine had a successful spell with Motherwell, as he was their top scorer with 21 goals during their promotion season of 1981–82. Like his manager Davie Hay, Irvine left Motherwell soon after that success, choosing to join Hibs. Irvine was also initially successful with the Edinburgh club, forming a strike partnership with Bobby Thomson that led to him being the second top goalscorer in the Scottish Premier Division in 1983–84. After this, however, Irvine enjoyed less success, and he was loaned out to Falkirk before joining Ayr United.

References 

1956 births
Living people
People from Whitburn, West Lothian
Footballers from West Lothian
Association football forwards
Scottish footballers
Celtic F.C. players
Alloa Athletic F.C. players
Motherwell F.C. players
Hibernian F.C. players
Falkirk F.C. players
Ayr United F.C. players
Scottish Football League players
Scottish Junior Football Association players
Fauldhouse United F.C. players